"Entre Nous" is the name of a 2003 song recorded by the French-born singer Chimène Badi. Released as her debut single in January 2003 from the album of the same name on which it features as the first track, it allowed Badi to achieve success in France where it topped the chart, and was a top five hit in Belgium (Wallonia) and Switzerland. To date, it is her most successful single. As of August 2014, the song was the 15th best-selling single of the 21st century in France, with 584,000 units sold.

The song was also performed on Badi's 2005 concert at the Olympia, Paris, and was also included on her live album Live à l'Olympia, as sixth track on the second CD.

The song was covered by Marc Lavoine and Jean-Baptiste Maunier for Les Enfoirés' 2006 album Le Village des Enfoirés and included in a medley named "Medley Adultes en enfants".  It was then covered again in 2012, this time sung by Amel Bent, Garou, Renan Luce and Hélène Segara

Track listing

 CD single
 "Entre Nous" — 3:22
 "Entre Nous" (instrumental version) — 3:03

 Digital download
 "Entre Nous" — 3:22
 "Entre Nous" (live) — 4:34

Certifications and sales

Charts

References

2003 songs
Chimène Badi songs
SNEP Top Singles number-one singles
Songs written by Rick Allison
2003 debut singles